The 2021–22 U20 Andebol 1 was the first season of Portuguese premier handball league for players under twenty years old. It ran from 17 October 2021 to 16 June 2022. Águas Santas won its first trophies, and it becomes the first club to conquer the U20 Portuguese Handball Championship.

Teams
The teams contesting the 2021-22 U20 Andebol 1 season are:

League Tables

First round

Group A

Group B

Group C

Group D

Second round

Group A

Group B

Group C

Group D

Third round

Top Three Goalscorers

Notes

References

External links
Portuguese Handball Federaration 

Andebol 1
Portugal
Handball